Alessio–Bianchi was an Italian professional cycling team which existed from 1998 to 2004. It was created in 1998 as Ballan. In 1999 Italian wheels manufacturer Alessio came in as co-sponsor, and in 2000 as main sponsor. The team was dissolved by the end of the 2004 season.

History
The team began in 1998 as Ballan. Flavio Miozzo, the team director said he selected the riders for the team very carefully filling a roster of only fourteen riders and hoping to race in some of the largest races in the world.

2004
The final year of the team started with a team presentation in Italy with Bianchi coming across from the now defunct  to sponsor the team. In early February news surfaced of the team being unable to pay some of their Scandinavian riders. On 13 February 2004 Memory Corp came in as a new sponsor to cover the wages of the riders who missed theirs. The teams first win came in Stage 3 of Giro della Provincia di Lucca by Alessandro Bertolini which led to Bertolini taking the leaders jersey by 1:51. Bertolini was one of eighteen who finished inside the time limit of the stage after the peloton allowed the break to get an advantage of over thirty minutes. Bertolini held onto the jersey to take the overall finishing 9 seconds down on the stage 4 winner Florent Brard. One of the Team's goals was the 2004 Tour de France with Pietro Caucchioli being their man in contention for the overall. The team had two riders finish in the top 10 of Stage 3.

Final Roster (2004)

Major wins 
Sources:

1998
 Stage 1 Giro di Calabria, Endrio Leoni
 Stage 4 Tirreno–Adriatico, Gabriele Colombo
 Stage 3a Four Days of Dunkirk, Alexandre Gontchenkov
 Stage 5 Four Days of Dunkirk, Gabriele Colombo
 Luk-Cup Bühl, Piotr Ugrumov
1999
 Stage 5 Tour Méditerranéen, Fabio Baldato
 Trofeo Pantalica, Andrea Ferrigato
 Berner Rundfahrt, Andrea Ferrigato
 Stage 4 Giro del Trentino, Alexandre Gontchenkov
 Stage 2 Four Days of Dunkirk, Andrea Ferrigato
 Stage 1 OBV Classic, Carlo Finco
 Stage 2 Danmark Rundt, Fabio Baldato
 Stage 3 Danmark Rundt, Nicola Loda
 Stage 4 Tour de Suisse, Gilberto Simoni
2001
 Stage 2 & 8 Tirreno–Adriatico, Endrio Leoni
 Stages 8 & 17 Giro d'Italia, Pietro Caucchioli
2002
 Stage 6 Tirreno–Adriatico, Franco Pellizotti
 Stage 4 Tour of the Basque Country, Franco Pellizotti
 Stages 17 & 20 Vuelta a España, Angelo Furlan
2003
 Stage 5 Tirreno–Adriatico, Ruggero Marzoli
 Stage 3 Tour de Romandie, Laurent Dufaux
 Stage 2 Giro d'Italia, Fabio Baldato
2004
 Overall Giro della Provincia di Lucca, Alessandro Bertolini
Stage 3, Alessandro Bertolini
 Gran Premio di Chiasso, Franco Pellizotti
 Paris-Roubaix, Magnus Bäckstedt
 Stage 5 Course de la Paix, Martin Hvastija
 Stage 1 Route du Sud, Cristian Moreni
  Road Race Championships, Cristian Moreni
 Scandinavian Open Road Race, Marcus Ljungqvist
 Coppa Bernocchi, Angelo Furlan
 Stages 1 & 4 Tour de Pologne, Fabio Baldato

References

Defunct cycling teams based in Italy
Cycling teams established in 1998
Cycling teams disestablished in 2004
1998 establishments in Italy
2004 disestablishments in Italy